KIBZ (104.1 FM, "104.1 The Blaze") is a Lincoln, Nebraska active rock music radio station. Studios are located on Cornhusker Highway in Northeast Lincoln, while its transmitter is located near Cortland.

History
104.1 FM signed on in 1976 as KTAP, a local station targeting the Crete area, and originally on 103.9 FM. In 1986 the call letters changed to KBVB.  In January 1989, after the station was sold to new owners, KBVB moved to 104.1 FM, relaunched as KKNB, "B104", and began airing a Top 40 (CHR) format, competing with KFRX. In March 1993, it flipped to alternative rock as "The Planet". On June 20, 1996, KKNB shifted to modern AC as "The Point", and would network with its then-sister station KTNP.

On November 24, 2000, after three days of stunting, KKNB flipped back to Top 40/CHR as "Kiss 104 FM", and changed call letters to KSLI-FM.

On March 17, 2004 KIBZ and its active rock format known as "The Blaze" moved to 104.1 from 106.3 FM.  Clear Channel Communications sold KIBZ to Three Eagles Communications on April 10, 2007. Three Eagles Communications sold KIBZ to Digity, LLC on February 10, 2014. The sale, which included KIBZ and 47 co-owned stations, was consummated on September 12, 2014 at a price of $66.5 million.

Effective February 25, 2016 Digity, LLC and its 124 radio stations were acquired by Alpha Media for $264 million.

Construction permit
On January 23, 2012, KIBZ was granted a Federal Communications Commission (FCC) construction permit to move to a new transmitter site, increase ERP to 40,000 watts and decrease HAAT to 116.1 meters.

References

External links
KIBZ 104.1 The Blaze

FCC construction permit

IBZ
Mass media in Lincoln, Nebraska
Radio stations established in 1992
Alpha Media radio stations